Toriy Scientific Production Association (romanized NPO Toriy) is a company based in Moscow, Russia. It is part of Ruselectronics.

The Toriy Scientific Production Association produces microwave tubes for use in radars, communications systems, television broadcasting electron accelerators (pulsed amplifiers), and nuclear reactors systems (gyrotrons) as well as medical equipment, and consumer goods. The association also produces linear accelerators, and claims to be the world's only producer of new high voltage vacuum control tubes (Titrons) for use in electron-beam welding installations and computer-based tomography.

The association includes the Titan Scientific-Research Institute, the main developer of microwave tubes and linear accelerators, and several smaller facilities located in and outside Moscow that produce medical equipment, vacuum pumps, and vacuum tube components.

References

External links
 

Manufacturing companies of Russia
Companies based in Moscow
Ruselectronics
Ministry of the Electronics Industry (Soviet Union)
Electronics companies of the Soviet Union